Nordre Folgefonna is one of the largest glaciers in mainland Norway. It is the northernmost of the three glaciers that make up Folgefonna. The glacier is located on the Folgefonna peninsula in the Hardanger and Sunnhordland regions of Vestland county. The  glacier lies in the municipalities of Kvinnherad and Ullensvang. The glacier lies almost entirely inside Folgefonna National Park.

See also
List of glaciers in Norway

References

External links

Glaciers of Vestland
Ullensvang
Kvinnherad